Xia Jun or Jun Xia is the name of:

Xia Jun (economist), better known as Jun Xia, Chinese economist
Jun Xia (architect), Chinese architect